Beechwood Trails is a census-designated place (CDP) in Harrison Township, Licking County, Ohio, United States. The population was 3,020 at the 2010 census, up from 2,258 at the 2000 census.

Geography
Beechwood Trails is located in southwestern Licking County at  (40.023725, -82.650823), in the northwest part of Harrison Township. It is bordered to the south and west by the city of Pataskala.

Ohio State Route 16 forms the southeast border of the CDP and leads east-northeast  to Newark, the Licking county seat, and west-southwest  to Columbus.

Demographics

At the 2000 census there were 2,258 people, 753 households, and 679 families living in the CDP. The population density was 653.8 people per square mile (252.7/km²). There were 766 housing units at an average density of 221.8/sq mi (85.7/km²).  The racial makeup of the CDP was 96.68% White, 1.20% African American, 0.31% Native American, 0.49% Asian, 0.04% from other races, and 1.28% from two or more races. Hispanic or Latino of any race were 0.62%.

Of the 753 households 43.8% had children under the age of 18 living with them, 85.0% were married couples living together, 3.3% had a female householder with no husband present, and 9.8% were non-families. 7.3% of households were one person and 1.3% were one person aged 65 or older. The average household size was 3.00 and the average family size was 3.17.

The age distribution was 29.0% under the age of 18, 5.8% from 18 to 24, 31.3% from 25 to 44, 29.4% from 45 to 64, and 4.5% 65 or older. The median age was 37 years. For every 100 females there were 102.1 males. For every 100 females age 18 and over, there were 100.5 males.

The median household income was $72,760 and the median family income  was $75,555. Males had a median income of $49,615 versus $33,929 for females. The per capita income for the CDP was $24,027. None of the families and 1.2% of the population were living below the poverty line, including no under eighteens and none of those over 64.

References

Census-designated places in Licking County, Ohio